The Waterloo Tournament also known as the Waterloo LTC Tournament was a men's and women's grass court tennis tournament held in Waterloo, Liverpool, Lancashire, Great Britain from 1881 to 1897.

History
The Waterloo Tournament was an early 19th century tennis event first staged around June 1881 at Waterloo, Liverpool, Lancashire, England. The first winner of the men's  singles was England's Richard Richardson. The final known edition was in 1897 was played at Aigburth Cricket Ground that was again won by Frank Riseley. It was a featured regeular series event on the Amateur Tennis Tour (1877-1912). Three Wimbledon men's  finalists played this event during the course of its run Richard Richardson, Donald Stewart and Frank Riseley. The 1883 and 1897 editions were held at Aigburth Cricket Ground, Liverpool. The 1885 women's event was won by future Wimbledon champion Lottie Dod.

Tournament finals
Notes: Challenge round: The final round of a tournament, in which the winner of a single-elimination phase faces the previous year's champion, who plays only that one match. The challenge round was used in the early history of tennis (from 1877 through 1921)  in some tournaments not all.

Men's singles
Included:

Men's doubles

Women's singles

Women's doubles

Mix doubles

Notes

References

Sources
 "Tournament – Waterloo". www.tennisarchives.com. Tennis Archives. 2017.

Further reading
 Ayre's Lawn Tennis Almanack And Tournament Guide, 1908 to 1938, A. Wallis Myers. 
 Badminton Magazine of Sports and Pastimes, Longman. London England 1890–1923.
 British Lawn Tennis and Squash Magazine, 1948 to 1967, British Lawn Tennis Ltd, UK.
 Dunlop Lawn Tennis Almanack And Tournament Guide, G.P. Hughes, 1939 to 1958, Dunlop Sports Co. Ltd, UK
 Lawn Tennis and Badminton Magazine, 1906 to 1973,  UK.
 Lowe's Lawn Tennis Annuals and Compendia, Lowe, Sir F. Gordon, Eyre & Spottiswoode
 Spalding's Lawn Tennis Annuals from 1885 to 1922, American Sports Pub. Co, USA.
 The World of Tennis Annuals, Barrett John, 1970 to 2001.
 The Field Lawn Tennis Calendar. The Field Office. from 1853. London. England

External links
http://www.tennisarchives.com/Tournaments 1885

Grass court tennis tournaments
Defunct tennis tournaments in the United Kingdom